The arrondissement of Boulogne-Billancourt is an arrondissement of France in the Hauts-de-Seine department in the Île-de-France region. It has 8 communes.

Composition

The communes of the arrondissement of Boulogne-Billancourt, and their INSEE codes, are:

 Boulogne-Billancourt (92012)
 Chaville (92022)
 Issy-les-Moulineaux (92040)
 Marnes-la-Coquette (92047)
 Meudon (92048)
 Sèvres (92072)
 Vanves (92075)
 Ville-d'Avray (92077)

History

The arrondissement of Boulogne-Billancourt was created in January 1973. At the January 2017 reorganisation of the arrondissements of Hauts-de-Seine, it received one commune from the arrondissement of Antony, and it lost two communes to the arrondissement of Nanterre.

As a result of the reorganisation of the cantons of France which came into effect in 2015, the borders of the cantons are no longer related to the borders of the arrondissements. The cantons of the arrondissement of Boulogne-Billancourt were, as of January 2015:

 Boulogne-Billancourt-Nord-Est
 Boulogne-Billancourt-Nord-Ouest
 Boulogne-Billancourt-Sud
 Chaville
 Issy-les-Moulineaux-Est
 Issy-les-Moulineaux-Ouest
 Meudon
 Saint-Cloud
 Sèvres

References

 
Boulogne-Billancourt